Woodwind instruments  are a family of musical instruments within the greater category of wind instruments. Common examples include flute, clarinet, oboe, bassoon, and saxophone. There are two main types of woodwind instruments:  flutes and reed instruments (otherwise called reed pipes). The main distinction between these instruments and other wind instruments is the way in which they produce sound. All woodwinds produce sound by splitting the air blown into them on a sharp edge, such as a reed or a fipple. Despite the name, a woodwind may be made of any material, not just wood. Common examples include brass, silver, cane, as well as other metals such as gold and platinum. The saxophone, for example, though made of brass, is considered a woodwind because it requires a reed to produce sound. Occasionally, woodwinds are made of earthen materials, especially ocarinas.

Flutes

Flutes produce sound by directing a focused stream of air below the edge of a hole in a cylindrical tube. The flute family can be divided into two sub-families: open flutes and closed flutes.

To produce a sound with an open flute, the player is required to blow a stream of air across a sharp edge that then splits the airstream. This split air stream then acts upon the air column contained within the flute's hollow causing it to vibrate and produce sound.  Examples of open flutes are the transverse flute, panpipes, and shakuhachi. Ancient flutes of this variety, including bamboo flutes, were often made from tubular sections of plants such as grasses, reeds, bamboo and hollowed-out tree branches. Later, flutes were made of metals such as tin, copper, or bronze. Modern concert flutes are usually made of high-grade metal alloys, usually containing nickel, silver, copper, or gold.

To produce a sound with a closed flute, the player is required to blow air into a duct.  This duct acts as a channel bringing the air to a sharp edge.  As with the open flutes, the air is then split; this causes the column of air within the closed flute to vibrate and produce sound.  Examples of this type of flute include the recorder, ocarina, and organ pipes.

Reed instruments
Reed instruments produce sound by focusing air into a mouthpiece which then causes a reed, or reeds, to vibrate. Similarly to flutes, reed pipes are also further divided into two types: single reed and double reed.

Single-reed woodwinds produce sound by fixing a reed onto the opening of a mouthpiece (using a ligature).  When air is forced between the reed and the mouthpiece, the reed causes the air column in the instrument to vibrate and produce its unique sound. Single reed instruments include the clarinet, saxophone, and others such as the chalumeau.

Double reed instruments use two precisely cut, small pieces of cane bound together at the base.  This form of sound production has been estimated to have originated in the middle to late Neolithic period; its discovery has been attributed to the observation of wind blowing through a split rush.   The finished, bound reed is inserted into the instrument and vibrates as air is forced between the two pieces (again, causing the air within the instrument to vibrate as well).  This family of reed pipes is subdivided further into another two sub-families: exposed double reed, and capped double reed instruments. 
 
Exposed double-reed instruments are played by having the double reed directly between the player's lips.  This family includes instruments such as the oboe, cor anglais (also called English horn), and bassoon, and many types of shawms throughout the world.

Capped double-reed instruments, on the other hand, have the double reed covered by a cap; the player blows through a hole in this cap that then directs the air through the reeds. This family includes the crumhorn.

Bagpipes are unique reed pipe instruments since they use two or more double or single reeds.  However, bagpipes are functionally the same as a capped double reed instruments since the reeds are never in direct contact with player's lips.

Free reed aerophone instruments are likewise unique since sound is produced by 'free reeds' –  small metal tongues arranged in rows within a metal or wooden frame. The airflow necessary for the instruments sound is generated either by a player's breath (e.g. harmonica), or by bellows (e.g. accordion).

Modern orchestra and concert band woodwinds 

The modern orchestra's woodwind section typically includes: flutes, oboes, clarinets, and bassoons. The piccolo, cor anglais, bass clarinet, E-flat clarinet, and contrabassoon are commonly used supplementary woodwind instruments. The section may also on occasion be expanded by the addition of saxophone(s).

The concert band's woodwind section is typically much larger and more diverse than the orchestra's. The concert band's woodwind section typically includes piccolos, flutes, oboes, B clarinets, bass clarinets, bassoons, alto saxophones, tenor saxophones, and baritone saxophones. The alto flute, cor anglais, E clarinet, alto clarinet, contra-alto clarinet, contrabass clarinet, contrabassoon, and soprano saxophone are also used, but not as frequently as the other woodwinds.

See also 
 Brass instrument
 Musical instrument
 Percussion instrument
 Wind instrument

References

External links 

 How do Woodwind Instruments work
 Woodwind Fingering Chart
 Woodwind Reference – ClassicalMusicHomepage.com

 
Musical instruments